Phenylmagnesium bromide, with the simplified formula , is a magnesium-containing organometallic compound. It is commercially available as a solution in diethyl ether or tetrahydrofuran (THF). Phenylmagnesium bromide is a Grignard reagent. It is often used as a synthetic equivalent for the phenyl "Ph−" synthon.

Preparation

Phenylmagnesium bromide is commercially available as solutions of diethyl ether or THF. Laboratory preparation involves treating bromobenzene with magnesium metal, usually in the form of turnings. A small amount of iodine may be used to activate the magnesium to initiate the reaction.

Coordinating solvents such as ether or THF, are required to solvate (complex) the magnesium(II) center.  The solvent must be aprotic since alcohols and water contain an acidic proton and thus react with phenylmagnesium bromide to give benzene.  Carbonyl-containing solvents, such as acetone and ethyl acetate, are also incompatible with the reagent.

Structure
The compound invariably forms an adduct with two  ligands from the ether or THF solvent. Thus, the Mg is tetrahedral and obeys the octet rule. The Mg–O distances are 201 and 206 pm whereas the Mg–C and Mg–Br distances are 220 pm and 244 pm, respectively.

Chemistry

Phenylmagnesium bromide is a strong nucleophile as well as a strong base. It can abstract even mildly acidic protons, thus the substrate must be protected where necessary. It often adds to carbonyls, such as ketones, aldehydes.  With carbon dioxide, it reacts to give benzoic acid after an acidic workup. If three equivalents are reacted with phosphorus trichloride, triphenylphosphine can be made.

References

Organomagnesium compounds
Phenyl compounds